Pietro d'Abano, also known as Petrus de Apono, Petrus Aponensis or Peter of Abano (1316), was an Italian philosopher, astrologer, and professor of medicine in Padua. He was born in the Italian town from which he takes his name, now Abano Terme. He gained fame by writing Conciliator Differentiarum, quae inter Philosophos et Medicos Versantur. He was eventually accused of heresy and atheism, and came before the Inquisition. He died in prison in 1315 (some sources say 1316) before the end of his trial.

Biography

He lived in Greece for a period of time before he moved and commenced his studies for a long time at Constantinople (between 1270 and 1290). Around 1300 he moved to Paris, where he was promoted to the degrees of doctor in philosophy and medicine, in the practice of which he was very successful, but his fees were remarkably high. In Paris he became known as "the Great Lombard". He settled at Padua, where he gained a reputation as a physician. In Padua he befriended an older scholar Paolo Tosetti. Also an astrologer, he was charged with practising magic: the particular accusations being that he brought back into his purse, by the aid of the devil, all the money he paid away, and that he possessed the philosopher's stone.

Gabriel Naudé, in his Antiquitate Scholae Medicae Parisiensis, gives the following account of him:

He carried his enquiries so far into the occult sciences of abstruse and hidden nature, that, after having given most ample proofs, by his writings concerning physiognomy, geomancy, and palmistry, he moved on to the study of philosophy, physics, and astrology. These studies proved extremely advantageous to him. The first two led to his introduction to all the popes of his time and gained him a reputation among scholars. Beyond that, his mastery of astrology is shown by
 the astronomical figures he had painted in the great hall of the palace at Padua
 his translations of the books of the great learned rabbi Abraham Aben Ezra
 his own books on critical days
 the improvement of astronomy
and the testimony of the renowned mathematician Regiomontanus, who praised his mastery of astrology in his public oration at Padua on Al-Farghani's masterwork Elements of astronomy on the celestial motions.}

Writings

In his writings he expounds and advocates the medical and philosophical systems of Averroes, Avicenna, and other Islamic  writers. His best known works are the Conciliator differentiarum quae inter philosophos et medicos versantur and De venenis eorumque remediis, both of which are extant in dozens of manuscripts and various printed editions from the late fifteenth through sixteenth centuries. The former was an attempt to reconcile apparent contradictions between medical theory and Aristotelian natural philosophy, and was considered authoritative as late as the sixteenth century.<ref>[https://www.questia.com/read/1E1-Abano-Pi The Columbia Encyclopedia, 6th ed.]</ref>

The famous grimoire called the Heptameron, though anonymous, has been traditionally attributed to Abano. The Heptameron is a concise book of ritual magical rites concerned with conjuring specific angels for the seven days of the week, whence the title derives. He is also credited with writing De venenis eorumque remediis, which expounded on Arab theories concerning superstitions, poisons and contagions.

The Inquisition

He was twice brought to trial by the Inquisition; on the first occasion he was acquitted, and he died before the second trial was completed. He was found guilty, however, and his body was ordered to be exhumed and burned; but a friend had secretly removed it, and the Inquisition had, therefore, to content itself with the public proclamation of its sentence and the burning of Abano in effigy.

According to Naude:

Barrett (p. 157) refers to the opinion that it was not on the score of magic that the Inquisition sentenced Pietro to death, but because he endeavoured to account for the wonderful effects in nature by the influences of the celestial bodies, not attributing them to angels or demons; so that heresy, rather than magic, in the form of opposition to the doctrine of spiritual beings, seems to have led to his persecution. To quote Barrett:

References

Further reading
 Francis Barrett (1801) The Magus 
 Joan Cadden (1997) "Sciences/silences: the nature and languages of 'sodomy' in Peter of Abano's Problemata Commentary". In: Karma Lochrie & Peggy McCracken & James Schultz (edd.), Constructing medieval sexualities'', University of Minnesota press, Minneapolis & London, pp. 40–57.

External links

 The Heptameron

1250s births
1316 deaths
People from the Province of Padua
Medieval Italian astrologers
Italian philosophers
Victims of the Inquisition
14th-century philosophers
Italian people who died in prison custody
13th-century Italian physicians
14th-century Italian physicians